Ajaniopsis is a genus of flowering plants in the daisy family described as a genus in 1978.

There is only one known species, Ajaniopsis penicilliformis, endemic to Tibet.

References

Monotypic Asteraceae genera
Anthemideae
Flora of Tibet